Pipturus argenteus, known as false stinger, native mulberry, white mulberry, white nettle, amahatyan (Chamorro), and ghasooso (Carolinian), is a small tree native to tropical Asia, northern and eastern Australia and the Pacific.

References

External links

Map of recorded sitings of Pipturus argenteus at the Australasian Virtual Herbarium

argenteus
Flora of the Andaman Islands
Flora of the Nicobar Islands
Flora of Malesia
Flora of Papuasia
Flora of Australia
Flora of the Pacific